The 2017 Nippon Professional Baseball season is the 68th season since the NPB was reorganized in 1950.

Regular season standings

Climax Series

First stage

Central League

Pacific League

Final stage

Central League

Pacific League

Japan Series

League leaders

Central League

Pacific League

See also
2017 KBO League season
2017 Major League Baseball season

References

 
2017 in baseball
2017 in Japanese sport